ETF Airways is a Croatian airline carrying out charter flights and ACMI operations.

History 
The airline was officially registered in November 2020, aiming to be operational with a Boeing 737-800 aircraft by summer 2021 on charter flights from several European countries to holiday destinations along the Adriatic coast of Croatia. In early 2021, the company announced that it would initially operate two aircraft during its first summer season with a third one due to arrive in early 2022 and plans for up to seven aircraft by 2025. Commencing operations was anticipated for April.

Certification was completed on 28 May 2021, when both its air operator's certificate (number HR-105)  and operating license (number HR-OL-29) were issued by the Croatian Civil Aviation Agency. 

The first Boeing 737-800 aircraft, registered 9A-LAB and named "Voyager" (as a reference to Star Trek movie series spacecraft) was delivered to Croatia on 22 May 2021. A second one, 9A-ABC - named "Enterprise", followed in June.

Ahead of commencing operations, ETF Airways signed a deal with Kosovan tour operator MyWings to base an aircraft in Pristina for flights from there to several destinations in Europe on behalf of MyWings.

Revenue operations commenced on 4 June 2021 with a flight between Pristina and Helsinki. Charter operations out of Pristina turned out somewhat successful for the young airline and eventually the second Boeing 737-800 was used for Kosovan operations during high season as well. Thereby, ETF Airways effectively operated in other markets than initially anticipated.

In late 2021, MyWings titles were applied on 9A-LAB as the aircraft continued to operate its long-term wet-lease on behalf of the Kosovarian tour operator. At the same time, the young airline secured an operating contract from French airline Corsair for its second Boeing 737. Starting 22 December 2021, it was utilized on daily round-trips between Reunion and Mayotte on behalf of the French carrier.

A third plane arrived in April 2022, registered 9A-KOR and nicknamed "Discovery".

Fleet
The ETF Airways consists of the following aircraft (as of September 2021):

Accidents and incidents
 During summer high peak, in early August 2021, one of its aircraft (9A-LAB) suffered a left hand engine failure after sucking a rabbit into it during landing at Bremen Airport in Germany. As a consequence, the aircraft was out of service for 12 days, reportedly causing one million euros in expenses for repairs and replacement aircraft. The aircraft has returned to service with a replacement engine, while the affected one has been sent to the shop for repairs. The Croatian airline blamed Bremen Airport authorities for negligence allowing wildlife to enter the active runway, an occurrence that reportedly happened on many occasions.

References

External links
 ETF Airways Official Site

Airlines of Croatia
Airlines established in 2020
2020 establishments in Croatia